USS Springfield was a  light cruiser of the United States Navy, which were built during World War II. The class was designed as a development of the earlier s, the size of which had been limited by the First London Naval Treaty. The start of the war led to the dissolution of the treaty system, but the dramatic need for new vessels precluded a new design, so the Clevelands used the same hull as their predecessors, but were significantly heavier. The Clevelands carried a main battery of twelve  guns in four three-gun turrets, along with a secondary armament of twelve  dual-purpose guns.

She was the third US Navy ship to be named after Springfield, Illinois. Commissioned in 1944, she served briefly in the Atlantic before transferring to the Pacific. There she served with fast carrier task forces, primarily in an anti-aircraft role, but also in a shore bombardment role in the last stages of the Pacific War. She earned two battle stars for wartime service. Like all but one of her sister ships, she was decommissioned and laid up soon after the end of World War II.

In the late 1950s she was one of three Cleveland-class ships to be converted into  guided missile cruisers. As part of this conversion, she was modified to become a flagship, which involved expanding her forward superstructure and removing most of her forward armament. She was recommissioned in 1960 as CLG-7 (later redesignated as CG-7). In her second career, she served entirely in the Atlantic and Mediterranean. She was decommissioned for the final time in 1974 and sold for scrap six years later.

Design

Following the start of World War II in September 1939, Britain announced it would suspend the treaty for the duration of the conflict, a decision the US Navy quickly followed. Though still neutral, the United States recognized that war was likely and the urgent need for additional ships ruled out an entirely new design, so the Clevelands were a close development of the earlier s, the chief difference being the substitution of a two-gun  dual-purpose gun mount for one of the main battery  gun turrets.

The ship was powered by four General Electric steam turbines, each driving one propeller shaft, using steam provided by four oil-fired Babcock & Wilcox boilers. Her crew numbered 1285 officers and enlisted men.

The ship was armed with a main battery of twelve 6 in /47 caliber Mark 16 guns in four 3-gun turrets on the centerline. Two were placed forward in a superfiring pair; the other two turrets were placed aft of the superstructure in another superfiring pair. The secondary battery consisted of twelve  /38 caliber dual-purpose guns mounted in twin turrets. Two of these were placed on the centerline, one directly behind the forward main turrets and the other just forward of the aft turrets. Two more were placed abreast of the conning tower and the other pair on either side of the aft superstructure. Anti-aircraft defense consisted of twenty-four Bofors  guns in four quadruple and four double mounts and twenty-one Oerlikon  guns in single mounts.

The main battery turrets were protected with  faces and  sides and tops, and they were supported by barbettes 6 inches thick. Springfields conning tower had 5-inch sides.

Construction and commissioning 
Springfield was laid down on 13 February 1943 by Bethlehem Steel Corp. at its Fore River yard, Quincy, Mass.; launched on 9 March 1944; co-sponsored by Mrs. Angelina Bertera of Springfield, Massachusetts, and Miss Norma McCurley of Springfield, Illinois; and commissioned on 9 September 1944 at Boston, Mass.

On 7 November, the light cruiser headed out of Boston harbor on her maiden voyage. Two days later, she put in at Norfolk, Va.; and, after several days of gunnery practice in the Chesapeake Bay, she started south for the British West Indies. The ship arrived in the Gulf of Paria, Trinidad, on the 21st and conducted shakedown training in that area during the following month. Springfield completed her shakedown training on 21 December and sailed back to Boston.

Service

1940s 
She steamed out of Boston again on 10 January 1945 to conduct further training exercises in the vicinity of Bermuda. At the completion of this assignment, Springfield cleared the area for Norfolk on the 13th. She remained in the Norfolk area and engaged in upkeep and gunnery drills in the Chesapeake Bay until 23 January. That morning, she weighed anchor and joined Task Group (TG) 21.5 off the entrance to Thimble Shoal Channel to accompany  on the first leg of the heavy cruiser's voyage to Malta carrying President Roosevelt. There, the President would board a plane to take him to the Crimea for the "Big Three" conference at Yalta. She transited the canal on 5 February and arrived in Pearl Harbor on the 16th.

The light cruiser spent five days there taking on water, fuel, stores, and ammunition; and conducting antiaircraft gunnery practice before getting underway for the Western Pacific. She stopped at Eniwetok Atoll on 2 March and arrived at Ulithi Atoll on the 6th. Springfield stood out of Ulithi on 14 March and joined the Fast Carrier Task Force (TF 58) on the next day.

For the next two and one-half months, Springfield cruised with TF 58. After a raid on Kyūshū and Honshū on 18 and 19 March, the task force zeroed in on Okinawa. From 23 March until 1 April, the cruiser helped ward off enemy air attacks while the carriers launched their planes to weaken the island's defenses. On 27 and 28 March, the light cruiser herself joined in the softening-up operation as she brought her guns to bear on Minami Daito Shima.

After the assault of 1 April 1945, the carriers' role changed from one of preparation to one of support to the invasion troops on Okinawa. Springfields mission, however, remained the same - to protect the carriers. For almost two months, she sailed in the huge screen of TF 58 to the east and southeast of Okinawa. Her crew members were subjected to frequent calls to general quarters, and they fought and watched as Japan's "Divine Wind" blew itself out against the combined strength of American combat air patrols and the surface antiaircraft screen. Her guns destroyed at least three enemy suicide planes. On 17 April, just after she had splashed one Japanese plane, Springfield narrowly escaped the fate of many of her sister ships when a kamikaze attempted to crash her.

On 10 and 11 May, Springfield departed from the antiaircraft screen to bombard Minami Daito Shima again. During the period from 23 March to 28 May, she left the Okinawa area only once, on 13 and 14 May, when she sailed with TF 58 to strike at Japanese air bases on Kyūshū.

On 27 May 1945, the 5th Fleet was redesignated the 3rd Fleet when Admiral Halsey relieved Admiral Spruance. Three days later, Springfield anchored in San Pedro Bay at Leyte in the Philippines for maintenance and upkeep. One month later, she departed Leyte and joined TF 38 for further air strikes against the Japanese home islands. On 10 and 11 July, the carriers launched planes against Tokyo. On the 13th and 14th, their targets were northern Honshū and Hokkaidō. The task force conducted an anti-shipping sweep along the coast of Honshū on the night of 14/15 July, and then, two days later, returned to hit Tokyo and Yokohama again. The planes bombed battleships Nagato and Haruna, on 18 July; then pounded Kobe and Kure on 24, 25, and 28 July. Springfield joined in a bombardment again on the night of 24/25 July; this time the targets were shore installations on southern Honshū. On 30 July, Tokyo once more suffered from the wrath of the flattops. Sweeping the coast of Honshū for enemy ships as they went, TF 38 returned to bomb northern Honshū and Hokkaido on 9 and 10 August. Three days later, the carriers sent their planes against Tokyo for the last raid of the war—on the 15th, hostilities in the Pacific ended.

Springfield entered Sagami Wan with TF 35 and anchored there on 27 August. Three days later, she covered both the entry of TF 31 into Tokyo Bay and the occupation of the Yokosuka Naval Base; and then returned to her anchorage. On 3 September, the light cruiser entered Tokyo Bay itself. On 20 September, while she was still in Tokyo Bay, the 3rd Fleet became the 5th Fleet again upon the return of Admiral Spruance. Springfield remained in the Far East until early January 1946. During the intervening three months, she visited Sasebo and Yokosuka in Japan; Shanghai, Taku, Tsingtao, and Chinwangtao in China; and Jinsen, Korea.

On 9 January 1946, she departed Tsingtao and headed east. She arrived in San Pedro, Calif., on 25 January en route to the Navy Yard at Mare Island.

The light cruiser returned to San Pedro on the 15th. She operated along the West Coast until 1 November, when she headed back to the Western Pacific. Springfield arrived at Guam on the 15th and operated in the Marianas, primarily between Guam and Saipan, until 19 February 1947. She stopped at Kwajalein Atoll from 25 to 27 February; then continued east. After a week stopover at Pearl Harbor, 11 to 18 March, she got underway for San Pedro, Calif., and arrived on 24 March 1947.

Springfield operated along the West Coast for just over 18 months, before voyaging again to the Far East. She reached Yokosuka on 3 November and cruised with the 7th Fleet until mid-May. During this deployment, she visited such familiar places as Sasebo, Yokosuka, Kure, Tsingtao, Shanghai, and Okinawa; and stopped at Hakodate and Otaru in Japan, and Hong Kong, all three of which were new ports of call for the light cruiser.

1950s 
She returned to the West Coast again on 1 June 1949 and three and one-half months later, commenced inactivation overhaul. In January 1950, Springfield joined the San Francisco Group of the Pacific Reserve Fleet. She remained berthed at San Francisco until March 1957. At that time, she was towed from the West Coast, via the Panama Canal, to Boston, Mass. On 15 May, she returned to the Fore River Yard of the Bethlehem Steel Co. at Quincy, Mass., to be converted to a Providence-class guided missile light cruiser, and redesignated CLG-7. Springfields conversion took more than three years, with the last three months of work being completed at the Boston Naval Shipyard.

1960s 

On 2 July 1960, she was recommissioned at Boston, under the command of Captain Francis D. Boyle. Between early July and November 1960, Springfield conducted acceptance trials off the New England coast and shakedown training in the vicinity of Guantanamo Bay, Cuba. On 4 December, she stood out of Boston and headed for the Mediterranean Sea. Ten days later, she relieved  as flagship of the Commander, 6th Fleet. With the exception of the period from 11 May to 15 December 1963, which she spent in overhaul at Brooklyn Navy Yard, Springfield cruised continuously with the 6th Fleet until 1967. During these years, she visited all the major ports of the Mediterranean, as well as some less well-known cities such as Dubrovnik and Split in Yugoslavia; Famagusta, Cyprus; and Ajaccio, Corsica. She also joined other units of the fleet and those of other nations in numerous national and multinational exercises. In addition, her role as flagship meant that many dignitaries visited her; among her guests were Constantine, King of Greece; Princess Grace of Monaco; several dozen ambassadors; and a host of prominent military figures. On 20 January 1967, Springfields home port was changed from Villefranche-sur-Mer, on the French Riviera, to Boston, Mass.

The guided-missile cruiser arrived in Boston on 16 February 1967 and immediately began a six-month yard overhaul. On 1 August, near the completion of the yard period, Springfield again changed home ports - this time to Norfolk, Va. She arrived at Yorktown, Va., on 6 August and, on 1 September, relieved  as flagship of the Commander, 2nd Fleet. She moved south in early September to the Atlantic Fleet Weapons Range, where she fired several missiles and conducted gunnery exercises. After fueling at Roosevelt Roads, Puerto Rico, the guided-missile cruiser sailed for Portsmouth, England, the first stop on an itinerary which also included Amsterdam in the Netherlands; Lisbon, Portugal; Barcelona, Spain; and Pollensa Bay at Majorca. Springfield returned to Norfolk on 6 November.

For the next 10 months, she operated out of Norfolk, conducting exercises and participating in a midshipman cruise. On 12 September 1968, Springfield headed northeast across the Atlantic to join NATO exercise "Silver Tower" in the Norwegian Sea north of the Arctic Circle. On 27 September, she cleared the exercise area and sailed south. Stopping at Rosyth, Scotland; Oslo, Norway; Portsmouth, England;Le Havre, France; Lisbon, Portugal; and arrived at Rota, Spain, on 23 October. There, another conference was held between the commanders of the 2nd and 6th Fleets. Springfield departed Rota on the 24th and sailed back to Norfolk, where she arrived on 1 November. She resumed normal operations out of Norfolk until 8 July, when the Commander, 2nd Fleet, shifted his flag to Newport News in order that Springfield might prepare for and commence a restricted availability.

1970s 

On 14 January 1970, Springfield relieved Newport News again as flagship of the 2nd Fleet. However, seven months later, the commander's flag returned to Newport News; and, on 10 August, Springfield headed back to the Mediterranean. On the 22nd, she relieved Little Rock as flagship of the 6th Fleet. The guided-missile cruiser spent almost four years cruising with the American fleet in the Mediterranean. During that time, she resumed her routine of exercises and diplomacy, hosting many dignitaries, among whom were President Richard Nixon and the Secretary of the Navy. On 28 September 1970, for example, Springfield hosted a major conference including Nixon, Secretaries Laird and Rogers, CJCS Admiral Moorer, General Goodpaster (SACEUR), Kissinger (National Security Advisor), Admiral Rivero (CINCAFSOUTH), and the commanders of U.S. Naval Forces, Europe, and the Sixth Fleet.

Springfield passed through the Straits of Gibraltar on four occasions during the long Mediterranean stint, visiting Casablanca, Morocco, and Lisbon, Portugal, twice each. In April 1973, flying the flag of Vice Admiral Gerald E. Miller, Commander, Sixth Fleet, she served as the command ship for flood relief operations in Tunisia, after four days of heavy rain had left 40,000 people homeless. Springfield remained in the Mediterranean Sea until relieved by Little Rock again on 1 September 1973. She sailed west, stopped at Gibraltar and in the Azores, and reached Boston, Mass., on 14 September. The Terrier missile system that the ship carried had become obsolete by the late 1960s, and an expensive refit would have been required to upgrade her radars and other systems to install the Standard Missile (SM) system. The ship's flagship suites made her an attractive candidate for the SM upgrade but funding was drying up in the Navy for old ships like the Springfield, and she was decommissioned instead.

Decommissioning 
Springfield remained in Boston until 17 September, then sailed south to Norfolk for inactivation. The guided-missile cruiser made Norfolk on 19 September and, just under three months later, entered the Inactive Ship Facility at Portsmouth, Va. Springfield decommissioned on 15 May 1974 and was berthed with the inactive fleet at Philadelphia, Pa.

Awards 
Springfield earned two battle stars during World War II.

Footnotes

Notes

Citations

References

External links

 
 Navy photographs of Springfield (CL-66)

 

Cleveland-class cruisers
Providence-class cruisers
Ships built in Quincy, Massachusetts
1944 ships
World War II cruisers of the United States
Cold War cruisers of the United States